University of Canterbury Mount John Observatory (UCMJO), previously known as Mt John University Observatory (MJUO), is New Zealand's premier astronomical research observatory. It is situated at  ASL atop Mount John at the northern end of the Mackenzie Basin in the South Island, and was established in 1965. There are many telescopes on site including: one 0.4-meter, two 0.6-meter, one 1.0-meter, and a new 1.8-meter MOA Telescope. The nearest population center is the resort town Lake Tekapo (pop. >500). Approximately 20% of nights at MJUO are photometric, with a larger number available for spectroscopic work and direct imaging photometry.

UCMJO is operated by the University of Canterbury, and is the home of HERCULES (High Efficiency and Resolution Canterbury University Large Echelle Spectrograph), and the observational wing of the Japanese/New Zealand MOA collaboration (Microlensing Observations in Astrophysics) led by Professor Yasushi Muraki of Nagoya University. A Japanese funded, 1.8-meter telescope is now in place and will be used initially by the MOA Project, before handover to the University of Canterbury at the conclusion of the MOA Project in 2012.

In June 2012 an area of  around the observatory was declared as the Aoraki Mackenzie International Dark Sky Reserve by the International Dark-Sky Association, one of only four such reserves around the world. The area has a Bortle Scale of 2.

Facilities 

There are 5 large telescopes on the mountain that are in regular use. There is also a cafe and night-tours run by tourist operators, Earth and Sky. There is accommodation for visiting researchers within the 1.0m building. A Superintendent lives on the mountain.

MOA Telescope 

Opened in 2004 December, this telescope was built by Japanese astronomers and is dedicated to the MOA project. It is a 1.8m prime focus reflector. The MOA telescope is the largest optical telescope in New Zealand.

McLellan Telescope 

This is a 1.0m Dall-Kirkham reflecting telescope run at either f/7.7 or f/13.5. Photometric imaging is by CCD camera and spectroscopy is by fibre-optic cable to the HERCULES spectrograph.

The McLellan Telescope is named after Professor Alister George McLellan who was the Head of Department at Canterbury University from 1955 to 1985. He was instrumental in the development of the Mt John Observatory and when it opened in 1965 he was appointed its first Director.

Boller & Chivens Telescope 

This is a 0.61m reflecting telescope run at either f/13.5 or occasionally f/6.25. Photometry is usually carried out using an FLI CCD camera.

Optical Craftsmen Telescope 

This is a 0.61m fork mounted reflecting telescope operating at f/16. This telescope is used exclusively for CCD photometry. It is currently being upgraded and commissioned for robotic use as part of the AAVSO's Robotic Telescope Network. This is the AAVSO's first Southern Hemisphere telescope.

Earth and Sky Telescope 

This telescope, used exclusively for visual tourist operations is a 0.4m Meade LX200 telescope.

Discoveries 

In June 2008 it was reported at the meeting of American Astronomical Society that using their new MOA-II telescope, the observatory discovered what is at the time the smallest planet known outside of our Solar System. The planet MOA-2007-BLG-192Lb is just 3.3 times larger than Earth and is orbiting a small star, MOA-2007-BLG-192L (3000 light years from Earth). There is some possibility the planet has a thick atmosphere and a liquid ocean on its surface.

References

External links 

 Mount John University Observatory - current webpage
 Mount John University Observatory - 2004 webpage
 HERCULES website
 MOA website
 Stars in a Cluster and other documents relating to the Observatory on archive.org

1960s architecture in New Zealand
Astronomical observatories in New Zealand
Buildings and structures in Canterbury, New Zealand
University of Canterbury
Mackenzie District